Ronnie Atkins (born Paul Christensen on 16 November 1964) is a Danish singer, best known as the co-founder, lead vocalist and primary songwriter for heavy metal band Pretty Maids. Atkins co-founded Pretty Maids in Horsens, Denmark in 1981 with guitarist Ken Hammer. Pretty Maids has released sixteen studio albums, four live albums and four extended plays.

He released his first solo album, One Shot, in 2021, followed by his sophomore album, Make It Count, in 2022.

Discography 

One Shot (2021)
4 More Shots (EP; 2021)
Make It Count (2022)

Health 
Atkins was diagnosed with lung cancer in 2019 and underwent at least 33 radiation and four chemotherapy treatments before being declared cancer-free. The lung cancer returned in 2021 in stage 4.

References 

1964 births
Danish heavy metal singers
Living people

PRETTY MAIDS Singer RONNIE ATKINS On His Stage Four Cancer Battle: 'I'm Pretty Much Living Day By Day'